Kenneth B. Eisenthal (born 23 March 1933 in New York City) is an American physical chemist.

Education and career
Eisenthal received a B.S. in chemistry from Brooklyn College. He graduated from Harvard University with an M.A. in physics and a Ph.D. in chemical physics. His doctoral thesis supervisor was Marshall Fixman. As a postdoc, Eisenthal worked at UCLA (University of California, Los Angeles), where he gained experience in molecular spectroscopy in the research group of Mostafa El-Sayed. After his stay at UCLA, Eisenthal briefly worked at The Aerospace Corporation and then at the IBM Almaden Research Center, where he did research in the Chemical Physics Group. The application of lasers in chemistry (laser chemistry) became his main field of work. The development of the picosecond laser in the late 1960s created new possibilities for measuring molecular relaxation processes. Eisenthal made important contributions to the then new field of picosecond-laser spectroscopy. In 1975 he moved to Columbia University, as the holder of a professorship ("Mark Hyman Professor of Chemistry"). At Columbia University he did fundamental research on free electrons in water, the photochemistry of carbenes, and other photochemical processes (photoisomerization), before his research activities focused on the application of lasers to investigation of the equilibrium and dynamic properties of molecules at liquid interfaces and at solid interfaces.

Eisenthal is the author or co-author of more than 200 scientific articles. His co-authors include Nicholas Turro. Eisenthal was a Guggenheim Fellow for the academic year 1984–1985. In 1986 he was elected a fellow of the American Physical Society. In 2000 he was elected a member of the National Academy of Sciences.

Selected publications

References

External links
 Kenneth B. Eisenthal Homepage at Columbia University
 

American physical chemists
Brooklyn College alumni
Harvard Graduate School of Arts and Sciences alumni
Columbia University faculty
Members of the United States National Academy of Sciences
Fellows of the American Physical Society
1933 births
Living people